89P/Russell is a periodic comet in the Solar System with a current orbital period of 7.28 years.

It was discovered on a photographic plate by Kenneth Russell of Siding Spring Observatory in New South Wales, Australia on 28 September 1980. Brightness was estimated at a magnitude of 17. The elliptical orbit calculated by Brian G. Marsden gave a perihelion date of 19 May 1980 and an orbital period of 7.12 years.

It has been observed on each subsequent apparition, most recently in 2009. The next perihelion is computed as 14 December 2016.

See also
List of numbered comets

References

Periodic comets
0089
090P
Comets in 2016
19800928